The 1973–74 St. John's Redmen basketball team represented St. John's University during the 1973–74 NCAA Division I men's basketball season. The team was coached by Lou Carnesecca in his sixth year at the school and his first since returning from coaching the New York Nets in the ABA. St. John's home games are played at Alumni Hall and Madison Square Garden.

Roster

Schedule and results

|-
!colspan=9 style="background:#FF0000; color:#FFFFFF;"| Regular Season

|-
!colspan=9 style="background:#FF0000; color:#FFFFFF;"| NIT Tournament

Team players drafted into the NBA

References

St. John's Red Storm men's basketball seasons
St. John's
St. John's
St John
St John